Teodoro "Dorino" Serafini (22 July 1909 – 5 July 2000) was a motorcycle road racer and racing driver from Italy.

A native of Pesaro (Marche), he won the 1939 500cc European Championship on a Gilera. He participated in one Formula One World Championship Grand Prix on 3 September 1950, when he finished second and scored 3 championship points, his points being halved as he shared the drive with Alberto Ascari. Serafini remains the only Formula One driver to have scored a podium finish in every World Championship Grand Prix they entered. He also competed in several non-Championship Formula One races.

Racing record

Complete Formula One World Championship results
(key) 

''* Indicates shared drive with Alberto Ascari

Non-championship Formula One results
(key)

1909 births
2000 deaths
People from Pesaro
Italian racing drivers
Italian Formula One drivers
Ferrari Formula One drivers
Italian motorcycle racers
24 Hours of Le Mans drivers
Sportspeople from the Province of Pesaro and Urbino